Curtis L. McClarin (December 19, 1969  – March 3, 2014) was an American film, television and stage actor. He began all three careers in the beginning of the 1990s, appearing in films such as The Hard Way and Fresh, in the television film Murder Without Motive: The Edmund Perry Story about the death of Edmund Perry, and on Broadway in the Tony Award nominated musical Bring in 'da Noise, Bring in 'da Funk.

Career
A resident of Brooklyn, New York, McClarin appeared in regional theatre productions across the United States.

His other film credits include Brother to Brother (2004), The Occupant and The Happening, and he had guest roles on television series such as The Good Wife, Damages, The Wire, Law & Order: SVU, Nurse Jackie and Oz. He was also the voice of the Grand Theft Auto III video game character, Curtly, even though his character was deleted from the final game, his name is still credited. He narrated the audio book Small Steps by Louis Sachar.

Later life and death
In March 2014, McClarin died in his sleep from a brain aneurysm, age 44.

The season six episode of Nurse Jackie, titled "Love Jungle", and the first episode of the mini series on Adult Swim, Neon Joe, Werewolf Hunter titled "Made Ya Look" are dedicated to his memory.

Filmography

References

External links
 
 

1969 births
2014 deaths
American male film actors
American male stage actors
American male musical theatre actors
American male television actors
Deaths from intracranial aneurysm
Male actors from New York City
Musicians from Brooklyn
20th-century American male actors
21st-century American male actors